Dennis Walter Conner  (born September 16, 1942) is an American yachtsman. He is noted for winning a bronze medal at the 1976 Olympics, two Star World Championships, and three wins in the America's Cup.

Sailing career
Conner was born September 16, 1942, in San Diego. He competed in the 1976 Olympics together with Conn Findlay and took the bronze medal in the Tempest class. Conner also took part in the 1979 Admiral's Cup, as helmsman on the Peterson 45 named Williwaw.

America's Cup
Conner has won the America's Cup three times, successfully defending the Cup in 1980, and 1988 and winning as the challenger in 1987. His 4-3 loss in 1983 to Australian Alan Bond's controversial wing-keeled challenger Australia II  was the first Cup defender to be defeated in the 132-year history of the race, simultaneously ending a run by the New York Yacht Club that began with the first contest. Following the loss Conner formed his own syndicate, the Sail America Foundation, through which he raised funds to mount a challenge on behalf of the San Diego Yacht Club, culminating with winning the Cup back from Australia in 1987. Conner's 1983 loss and the subsequent 1987 victory are the basis of the 1992 American Zoetrope film Wind.

The Big Boat Challenge and the beginning of multihulls in America's Cup
Representing the San Diego Yacht Club (SDYC), Conner's Sail America Foundation faced another controversial challenger in 1988, backed by New Zealand banker Michael Fay. Fay's team abandoned the 12-meter format that had prevailed since the pre-WW II demise of the massive and fantastically expensive J-sloops, and challenged with a huge and unconventional 90' super-sloop (KZ1). Conner responded with an even more controversial 60' wing-sailed catamaran (US-1) in a surprise defense.

Fay's challenge and legal case based on the Deed foreshadowed the controversial 33rd America's Cup, whose legal wrangling resulted in the contest being decided in enormous multihulls in February 2010, while returning to the pre-war style of exclusive, billionaire backed campaigns of Alinghi and BMW Oracle Racing.

Leadership and management

Before the 1980s, America's Cup competitors were mostly amateurs who took time off from their regular jobs to compete.  Conner insisted on year round training with a new focus on physical fitness and practice.  This change in approach led to a return to professional crews in sailing, which had hardly been seen since the 1930s.

Funding and setbacks

Perhaps due to the bad media attention surrounding the 1988 catamaran defense, Conner had insufficient funding to mount a multiple-boat defense in 1992, which also heralded the debut of the IACC yacht. His USA-11 proved no match to Bill Koch's America3 campaign.  USA-11 was built as a test-bed for design ideas that were to be incorporated into the "racing" boat, nicknamed TDC-2.  However, TDC-2 was never built.  Its ideas were incorporated into his single-boat campaign for 1995, and the yacht Stars & Stripes USA-34.  After almost sinking during The Citizen Cup defender trials, USA-34 went on to a come-from-behind win over Mighty Mary, earning the right to defend The Cup against Team New Zealand's Black Magic, NZL-32. Believing Stars & Stripes was no match against the Black Magic, Dennis Conner swapped boats for the Cup matches, pitting Young America against New Zealand's Black Magic NZL–32. But the result was a humiliating defeat for Dennis Conner, losing to Team New Zealand 0–5.

Conner again found difficulty securing funding for the 2000 America's Cup in Auckland, New Zealand. As in 1992 and 1995, he mounted a single-boat campaign centered upon Stars & Stripes USA-55.  Conner was eliminated in the quarter final repechage by Craig McCaw's OneWorld Challenge.

Conner was a rare non-billionaire fielding a team to compete in the 2003 America's Cup, held in New Zealand, receiving funding of up to US$40 million from his sponsors. His syndicate, Stars & Stripes, suffered a severe setback before they departed California, as one of the two Stars & Stripes boats (USA-77) sank when its rudder post failed during training. Despite raising the boat from 55 feet of water and eventually repairing it, they were unable to recover the valuable testing time lost and they were defeated in the quarter-finals of the Louis Vuitton Cup.

2003 marked Conner's last participation in the America's Cup.

Yachting accomplishments 
 3-time winner, America's Cup, 1980, 1987 and 1988
 2-time loser, America's Cup, 1983 and 1995
 Inductee, America's Cup Hall of Fame
 Captain, two Whitbread Round-the-World races (On boat Winston in 1993-94 and on boat Toshiba 1997-98.) (see Volvo Ocean Race)
 28 World Championships
 Three-time winner, U.S. Yachtsman of the Year: 1975, 1980 and 1986
 Seven-time winner, San Diego Yachtsman of the Year
 Olympic Bronze Medal winner, 1976
 4 Southern Ocean Racing Cups
 2 Congressional Cups
 1987 ABC Wide World of Sports Athlete of the Year
 National Sailing Hall of Fame Founding Inductee in 2011
 Maxi yacht racing
 One of only four American sailors inducted into the ISAF Sailing Hall of Fame
 2-time winner Etchells World Championship (1991 San Francisco, 1994 Newport Beach)

Honors and activities 
 Honorary doctorate from Green Mountain College, 1987
 Honorary doctorate from the  Medical College of the University of South Carolina, 1987
 America's Greatest Sailor, US Sailing's Greatest American Sailor Tournament
 Commencement speaker, United States Naval Academy
 Cover of Time magazine, February 9, 1987 
 Cover of Sports Illustrated with President Ronald Reagan, February 1987 
 Artist, sales of artwork in the several millions of dollars
 Motivational speaker
 Member of the San Diego Yacht Club, (Silvergate Yacht Club), New York Yacht Club, Yacht Club de Monaco
 San Diego Rotary

Education 
 Bachelor's degree from San Diego State University

Publications 
 No Excuse to Lose, 1987
 Comeback: My Race for the America's Cup, 1987
 Learn to Sail: A Beginner's Guide to the Art, Equipment and Language of Sailing on a Lake or Ocean, 1998
 The America's Cup: The History of Sailings Greatest Competition in the Twentieth Century, 1998
 The Art of Winning, 1990
 Sail Like a Champion, 1992
 America's Cup Cookbook, 1992
 Life's Winning Tips, 1997

References

External links
 
 
 
 

1942 births
American male sailors (sport)
Living people
Members of the New York Yacht Club
Olympic bronze medalists for the United States in sailing
Point Loma High School alumni
San Diego State University alumni
Sailors at the 1976 Summer Olympics – Tempest
Star class world champions
Sportspeople from San Diego
US Sailor of the Year
Volvo Ocean Race sailors
San Diego Yacht Club sailors
Medalists at the 1976 Summer Olympics
2003 America's Cup sailors
2000 America's Cup sailors
1995 America's Cup sailors
1992 America's Cup sailors
1988 America's Cup sailors
1987 America's Cup sailors
1983 America's Cup sailors
1980 America's Cup sailors
1974 America's Cup sailors
World champions in sailing for the United States
Etchells class world champions